The individual normal hill/10 km competition in Nordic combined at the 2022 Winter Olympics was held on 9 February, at the Kuyangshu Nordic Center and Biathlon Center in Zhangjiakou. Vinzenz Geiger of Germany won the event. For him, this was the first Olympic medal in an individual event. Jørgen Graabak of Norway, the 2014 individual large hill and team champion, was second. Lukas Greiderer of Austria won the bronze medal, his first Olympic medal.

The defending champion was Eric Frenzel, who won this event in 2014 and 2018. Frenzel qualified for the Olympics but did not participate in the event. The 2018 silver medalist, Akito Watabe, qualified as well. but the bronze medalist, Lukas Klapfer, did not. Johannes Lamparter was the overall leader of the 2021–22 FIS Nordic Combined World Cup before the Olympics, followed by Jarl Magnus Riiber and Geiger. Riiber was the 2021 World Champion in individual large hill/10 km. Riiber had to withdraw from the event due to a positive COVID-19 test.

Ryota Yamamoto won the jump. In the cross-country part, the three athletes with the next best results in the jump, Greiderer, Julian Schmid, and Johannes Rydzek, soon caught up with Yamamoto and skied together, followed by another group 25–30 seconds behind. At 6 km, Yamamoto has already dropped out of medal contention, and Greiderer, Schmid, and Rydzek were 30 seconds ahead of the second group, then the gap started to narrow. The group caught up with Greiderer, but at 8.5 km Schmid and Rydzek were still 15 seconds ahead. Finally, they were caught up as well, and at the finish line Geiger was first, Graabak second, and Greiderer third, with Lamparter fourth not so far behind.

Qualification

Results

Ski jumping
The ski jumping part was held at 16:00.

Cross-country
The cross-country part was held at 19:00.

References

Nordic combined at the 2022 Winter Olympics